Aulus Plautius may refer to:

 Aulus Plautius, a tribune of plebs in 70 BC, later the legate of Pompey responsible for Sicily in the war against the pirates. Appian refers to him as "Plautius Varus."
 Aulus Plautius, another tribune who read a letter from Ptolemy XII of Egypt before the Senate in 56 BC. Urban praetor in 51, later the governor of Bithynia and Pontus.
 Aulus Plautius (suffect consul 1 BC).
 Aulus Plautius, Roman general who conquered Roman Britain.

Notes